Straight Creek may refer to:
Straight Creek Township, Jackson County, Kansas
Straight Creek, Kentucky
Straight Creek (Ohio River), a stream in Ohio
Straight Creek Fault